Many sundials bear a motto to reflect the sentiments of its maker or owner.

English mottos
 Be as true to each other as this dial is to the sun.
 Begone about Thy business.
 Come along and grow old with me; the best is yet to be.
 Hours fly, Flowers die. New days, New ways, Pass by. Love stays.
 Hours fly, Flowers bloom and die. Old days, Old ways pass. Love stays.
 I only tell of sunny hours.
 I count only sunny hours.
 Let others tell of storms and showers, I tell of sunny morning hours.
 Let others tell of storms and showers, I'll only count your sunny hours. Has date of 1767
 Life is but a shadow: the shadow of a bird on the wing.
 Self-dependent power can time defy, as rocks resist the billows and the sky. 
 Time, like an ever-rolling stream, bears all its sons away.
 Today is Yesterday's Tomorrow
 When I am gone, mark not the passing of the hours, but just that love lives on.
 The Concern of the Rich and the Poor 
 Time Takes All But Memories
 Some tell of storms and showers, I tell of sunny hours.
 Order in the court!

Latin mottos

Time flies
 Hora fugit, ne tardes. (The hour flees, don't be late.)
 Ruit hora. (The hour is flowing away.)
 Tempus breve est. (Time is short.)
 Tempus fugit [velut umbra]. (Time flees [like a shadow].)
 Tempus volat, hora fugit. (Time flies, the hour flees.)

Make use of time
 Altera pars otio, pars ista labori. (Devote this hour to work, another to leisure.)
 Festina lente. (Make haste, but slowly.)
 [Fugit hora] – carpe diem. ([The hour flees] – seize the day.)
 Utere, non numera. (Use the hours, don't count them.)
 Utere non reditura. (Use the hour, it will not come again.)

Human mortality

 Ex iis unam cave. (Beware of one hour.)
 Lente hora, celeriter anni. (An hour passes slowly, but the years go by quickly.)
 Meam vide umbram, tuam videbis vitam. (Look at my shadow and you will see your life.)
 Memor esto brevis ævi. (Remember how short is life.)
 Mox nox. (Night, shortly.)
 [Nobis] pereunt et imputantur. ([The hours] are consumed and will be charged [to our] account)
 Omnes vulnerant, ultima necat. (All hours wound; the last one kills.)
 [Pulvis et] umbra sumus. (We are [dust and] shadow.)
 Serius est quam cogitas. (It's later than you think.)
 Sic labitur ætas. (Thus passes a lifetime.)
 Sic vita fluit, dum stare videtur. (Life flows away as it seems to stay the same.)
 Ultima latet ut observentur omnes. (Our last hour is hidden from us, so that we watch them all.)
 Umbra sicut hominis vita. (A person's life is like a shadow.)
 Una ex his erit tibi ultima. (One of these [hours] will be your last.)
 Ver non semper viret. (Springtime does not last.)
 Vita fugit, sicut umbra (Life passes like the shadow.)
 Vita similis umbræ. (Life resembles a shadow.)

Transience
 Tempus edax rerum. (Time devours things.)
 Tempus vincit omnia. (Time conquers everything.)
 Vidi nihil permanere sub sole. (I have seen that nothing under the sun endures.)

Virtue
 Dum tempus habemus operemur bonum. (While we have time, let us do good.)
 Omnes æquales sola virtute discrepantes. (All hours are the same – they are distinguished only by good deeds.)

Living

 Amicis qualibet hora. (Any hour for my friends.)
 Dona præsentis cape lætus horæ [ac linque severe]. (Take the gifts of this hour.)
 Fruere hora. (Enjoy the hour.)
 Post tenebras spero lucem. (I hope for light to follow darkness.)
 Semper amicis hora. (Always time for friends.)
 Sit fausta quæ labitur. (May the hour be favorable.)
 Sol omnibus lucet. (The sun shines for everyone.)
 Tempus omnia dabit. (Time will give everything.)
 Una dabit quod negat altera. (One hour will give what another has refused.)
 Vita in motu. (Life is in motion.)
 Vivere memento. (Remember to live.)

Humorous
 Horas non numero nisi æstivas (I count only the summer hours)
 Horas non numero nisi serenas (I count only the sunny hours)
 Nunc est bibendum (Now is the time to drink)
 Si sol deficit, respicit me nemo. (If the sun's gone, nobody looks at me)
 Sine sole sileo. (Without the sun I fall silent.)

German mottos
 Mach' es wie die Sonnenuhr; Zähl' die heitren Stunden nur! (Do like a sundial; count only the sunny hours!)

References
Notes

Footnotes

Bibliography
 Reprint of 1902 book published by Macmillan (New York).
 Slightly amended reprint of the 1970 translation published by University of Toronto Press, Toronto. The original was published in 1965 as Les Cadrans solaires by Gauthier-Villars (Montrouge, France).
 Selections from the 1895 paper by Raphaël Blanchard in the Bulletin de la Société d'Etudes des Hautes-Alpes.

Further reading

Links

Sundials
Sundials